Ezekiel Jonathan "Zeke" Emanuel (born September 6, 1957) is an American oncologist, bioethicist and senior fellow at the Center for American Progress. He is the current Vice Provost for Global Initiatives at the University of Pennsylvania and chair of the Department of Medical Ethics and Health Policy. Previously, Emanuel served as the Diane and Robert Levy University Professor at Penn. He holds a joint appointment at the University of Pennsylvania School of Medicine and the Wharton School and was formerly an associate professor at the Harvard Medical School until 1998 when he joined the National Institutes of Health.

On November 9, 2020, President-elect Joe Biden named Emanuel to be one of the 16 members of his COVID-19 Advisory Board.

Early life and education
Emanuel is the son of Benjamin M. Emanuel and Marsha (Smulevitz) Emanuel. His father, Benjamin M. Emanuel, is a Jerusalem-born pediatrician who was once a member of the Irgun, a Jewish paramilitary organization that operated in Mandate Palestine. He provided free care to poor immigrants and led efforts to get rid of lead paint that was dangerous for children; as of 2010 he lived in a Chicago suburb. Emanuel's mother, Marsha, a nurse and psychiatric social worker who was raised in the North Lawndale community on Chicago's West Side, was active in civil rights, including the Congress of Racial Equality (CORE). She attended marches and demonstrations with her children. In a 2009 interview Emanuel recalled that in his childhood "worrying about ethical questions was very much part and parcel of our daily routine."

His two younger brothers are former Chicago mayor Rahm Emanuel and Hollywood-based talent agent Ari Emanuel. He has an adopted sister, Shoshana Emanuel, who has cerebral palsy. His father's brother, Emanuel, was killed in the Great Arab Revolt in the British Mandate of Palestine, after which the family changed its name from Auerbach to Emanuel in his honor.

As children, the three Emanuel brothers shared a bedroom and spent summers together in Israel. All three brothers took ballet lessons in their childhood, which Emanuel says "hardened us and taught us that if you do something unusual, people will take potshots at you." Emanuel and his brother Rahm frequently argue about healthcare policy. Emanuel mimics his brother's end of the conversation: "You want to change the whole healthcare system, and I can't even get SCHIP [State Children's Health Insurance Program] passed with dedicated funding? What kind of idiot are you?"

Emanuel graduated from Amherst College in 1979 and subsequently received his M.Sc. from Exeter College, Oxford in Biochemistry. He simultaneously studied for an M.D. and a Ph.D. in Political Philosophy from Harvard University, receiving the degrees in 1988 and 1989, respectively. He was a member of the first cohort of Faculty Fellows at the Edmond J. Safra Center for Ethics at Harvard from 1987–88. Emanuel completed an internship and residency at Beth Israel Hospital in internal medicine. Subsequently, he undertook fellowships in medicine and medical oncology at the Dana–Farber Cancer Institute, and is a breast oncologist.

Personal life 
Emanuel is a divorced father of three daughters.

Career
After completing his post-doctoral training, Emanuel pursued a career in academic medicine, rising to the level of associate professor at Harvard Medical School in 1997. He soon moved into the public sector, and held the position of Chief of the Department of Bioethics at the Clinical Center of the U.S. National Institutes of Health. Emanuel served as Special Advisor for Health Policy to Peter Orszag, the former Director of the Office of Management and Budget in the Obama administration. Emanuel entered the administration with different views from President Barack Obama on how to reform health care, but was said by colleagues to be working for the White House goals.

Since September 2011, Emanuel has headed the Department of Medical Ethics & Health Policy at the University of Pennsylvania, where he also serves as a Penn Integrates Knowledge Professor, under the official title Diane S. Levy and Robert M. Levy University Professor. On November 9, President-elect Joe Biden named Emanuel to be one of the 16 members of his coronavirus advisory board.

Political and professional opinions

Portable health insurance 
In articles and in his book Healthcare, Guaranteed, Emanuel said that universal health care could be guaranteed by replacing employer paid health care insurance, Medicaid and Medicare with health care vouchers funded by a value-added tax. His plan
would allow patients to keep the same doctor even if they change jobs or insurance plans. He would reduce co-payments for preventive care and tax or ban junk food from schools. He criticized the idea of requiring individuals to buy health insurance. However, he supports Obama's plans for health care reform, even though they differ from his own.

In the article Why Tie Health Insurance to a Job?, Emanuel said that employer based health insurance should be replaced by state or regional insurance exchanges that pool individuals and small groups to pay the same lower prices charged to larger employers. Emanuel said that this would allow portable health insurance even to people that lose their jobs or change jobs, while at the same time preserving the security of employer based health benefits by giving consumers the bargaining power of a large group of patients. According to Emanuel, this would end discrimination by health insurance companies in the form of denial of health insurance based on age or preexisting conditions. In Solved!, Emanuel said that Universal Healthcare Vouchers would solve the problem of rapidly increasing health care costs, which, rising at three times the rate of inflation, would result in higher copayments, fewer benefits, stagnant wages and fewer employers willing to pay for health care benefits.

In an article co-written by Ezekiel Emanuel and Victor Fuchs, Emanuel co-wrote that employer-based health insurance has "inefficiencies and inequities", that Medicaid is "second-class" and that insuring more people without replacing those systems would be to build on a "broken system". He said, "in the short run they require ever more money to cover the uninsured, and in the long run the unabated rise in health costs will quickly revive the problem of the uninsured." He suggested that a federal agency be created to test the effectiveness of new health care technology.

As Emanuel co-wrote,
At $2 trillion per year, the U.S. health-care system suffers much more from inefficiency than lack of funds. The system wastes money on administration, unnecessary tests and marginal medicines that cost a lot for little health benefit. It also provides strong financial incentives to preserve such inefficiency.

By building on the existing health-care system, these reform proposals entrench the perverse incentives.

Moreover, even plans that reduce the number of uninsured today may find that those gains will disappear in a few years if costs continue to grow much faster than gross domestic product. As costs rise, many companies will drop insurance and pay the modest taxes or fees that have been proposed. States will find that costs exceed revenue and that cuts will have to be made.

Emanuel said that replacing employer-based health insurance and programs like Medicaid would "improve efficiency and provide cost control for the health-care system."

Emanuel and Fuchs reject a single-payer system, because it goes against American values of individualism. "The biggest problem with single-payer is its failure to cohere with core American values. Single-payer puts everyone into the same system with the same coverage and makes it virtually impossible to add amenities and services through the private market."

The Ends of Human Life 
In his book The Ends of Human Life Emanuel used the AIDS patient "Andrew" as an example of moral medical dilemmas. Andrew talked to a local support group and signed a living will asking that life sustaining procedures be withdrawn if there is no reasonable expectation of recovery. The will was not given to anyone but kept in his wallet, and no one was given power of attorney. There were questions about his competence since he had AIDS dementia when he signed the will. Still, Andrew's lover said that he had talked about such situations, and asked that Andrew be allowed to die. Andrew's family strongly disagreed that Andrew wanted to die. Dr. Wolf previously saved Andrew's life, but promised to help him avoid a "miserable death". The ICU wanted guidance from Dr. Wolf as to how aggressively they should try to keep Andrew alive, as his chances of surviving a cardiac arrest were about zero. Two other critical patients were recently refused admission because of a bed shortage. There was a question as to whether Andrew's lover was representing Andrew's wishes or his own. There was also a question as to whether Andrew's parents knew Andrew better than others, or whether they were motivated by guilt from rejecting Andrew's identification as a gay male. The cost of aggressive treatment was $2,000 per day.

This dilemma illustrates the ethical challenges faced by even the most conscientious physicians, in addition to patient confidentiality, the meaning of informed consent, and the ethics of experimental treatments, transplanting genes or brain tissue. Also, while many agree that every citizen should be given adequate health care, few agree on how to define what adequate health care is. Many of these issues have become almost insoluble moral dilemmas. Babies that would be born with serious birth defects pose a serious moral dilemma, and medical technology makes it sometimes difficult to define what death is in the case of permanently brain damaged patients on respirators. There are also ethical questions on how to allocate scarce resources. However, the Hippocratic Oath is proof that medical technology is not the cause of medical questions about ethics.

Emanuel said the Hippocratic Oath and the codes of modern medical societies require doctors to maintain client patient confidentiality, refrain from lying to a patient, keep patients informed and obtain their consent, in order to protect the patient from manipulation and discrimination. Emanuel said that a doctor's oath would never allow him to administer a lethal injection for capital punishment as a doctor, although the issue would be different if he were asked to serve on a firing squad not as a doctor but rather as a citizen. He said that in the case of mercy killing there are rare cases where the medical obligation to relieve suffering would be in tension with the obligation to save a life, and that a different argument (an argument that intentional killing "should not be used to achieve the legitimate ends of medicine") would be required instead.

Emanuel believes that "liberal communitarianism" could be the answer. Citizens, according to this view, should be given rights needed to participate in democratic deliberations based on a "common conception of the good life". For example, vouchers could be granted through thousands of Community Health Programs (CHPs), each of which would agree on its own definition of the public good. Each CHP would decide which services would be covered as basic, and which services would not be covered.

Opposition to legalization of euthanasia (1997) 
Emanuel said that legalizing euthanasia, as was done in the Netherlands, might be counterproductive, in that it would decrease support for pain management and mental health care. However, Emanuel does support the use of Medical Directives to allow patients to express their wishes when they can no longer communicate. Ezekiel, and his former wife Linda Emanuel, an M.D. Ph.D. bioethicist and geriatrician, created the Medical Directive, which is described as more specific and extensive than previous living wills and is a third generation Advance Directive. He claims the Hippocratic Oath debunks the theory that opposition to euthanasia is modern. Emanuel said that for the vast majority of dying patients, "legalizing euthanasia or physician-assisted suicide would be of no benefit. To the contrary, it would be a way of avoiding the complex and arduous efforts required of doctors and other health-care providers to ensure that dying patients receive humane, dignified care." Emanuel said that a historical review of opinions on euthanasia from ancient Greece to now "suggests an association between interest in legalizing euthanasia and moments when Social Darwinism and raw individualism, free markets and wealth accumulation, and limited government are celebrated."

Emanuel said that it is a myth that most patients who want to die choose euthanasia because they are in extreme pain. He said that in his own experience, "those with pain are more likely than others to oppose physician-assisted suicide and euthanasia." He said that patients were more likely to want euthanasia because of "depression and general psychological distress ... a loss of control or of dignity, of being a burden, and of being dependent." He also said that the kind of legalized euthanasia practiced in the Netherlands would lead to an ethical "slippery slope" which would make it easier for doctors to rationalize euthanasia when it would save them the trouble of cleaning bedpans and otherwise caring for patients who want to live. He said that legalized euthanasia in the Netherlands did not adhere to all the legal guidelines, and that some newborns were euthanised even though they could not possibly have given the legally required consent. As Emanuel said, "The Netherlands studies fail to demonstrate that permitting physician-assisted suicide and euthanasia will not lead to the nonvoluntary euthanasia of children, the demented, the mentally ill, the old, and others. Indeed, the persistence of abuse and the violation of safeguards, despite publicity and condemnation, suggest that the feared consequences of legalization are exactly its inherent consequences." Emanuel also expressed the concern that budgetary pressures might be used to justify euthanasia if it were legal.

Emanuel said that claims of cost saving from assisted suicide are a distortion, and that such
costs are relatively small, including only 0.1 percent of total medical spending.

In 2016, Emanuel wrote in the article Attitudes and Practices of Euthanasia and Physician-Assisted Suicide in the United States, Canada, and Europe that existing data on physician-assisted suicide does not indicate widespread abuse. This article also noted that physician-assisted suicide has been increasingly legalized while remaining relatively rare and largely confined to oncology patients.

Rationing, death panel controversy (2009) 

The controversy surrounding Emanuel is due to claims by Betsy McCaughey and Sarah Palin accusing Emanuel of supporting euthanasia. Emanuel has opposed euthanasia. These claims have been used by Republicans opposing health care reform.

Betsy McCaughey described Ezekiel Emanuel as a "Deadly Doctor" in a New York Post opinion article. The article, which accused Emanuel of advocating healthcare rationing by age and disability, was quoted from on the floor of the House of Representatives by Representative Michele Bachmann of Minnesota. Sarah Palin cited the Bachmann speech and said that Emanuel's philosophy was "Orwellian" and "downright evil", and tied it to a health care reform end of life counseling provision she claimed would create a "death panel". Emanuel said that Palin's death panel statement was "Orwellian".
Palin later said that her death panel remark had been "vindicated" and that the policies of Emanuel are "particularly disturbing" and "shocking". On former senator Fred Thompson's radio program, McCaughey warned that "the healthcare reform bill would make it mandatory—absolutely require—that every five years people in Medicare have a required counseling session that will tell them how to end their life sooner." She said those sessions would help the elderly learn how to "decline nutrition, how to decline being hydrated, how to go in to hospice care ... all to do what's in society's best interest or in your family's best interest and cut your life short." As The New York Times mentioned, conservative pundits were comparing Nazi Germany's T4 euthanasia program to Obama's policies as far back as November 2008, calling them "America's T4 program—trivialization of abortion, acceptance of euthanasia, and the normalization of physician assisted suicide."

PolitiFact described McCaughey's claim as a "ridiculous falsehood." FactCheck.org said, "We agree that Emanuel's meaning is being twisted. In one article, he was talking about a philosophical trend, and in another, he was writing about how to make the most ethical choices when forced to choose which patients get organ transplants or vaccines when supplies are limited." An article on Time.com said that Emanuel "was only addressing extreme cases like organ donation, where there is an absolute scarcity of resources ... 'My quotes were just being taken out of context.'" A decade ago, when many doctors wanted to legalize euthanasia or physician-assisted suicide, Emanuel opposed it. Emanuel said the "death panel" idea is "an outright lie, a complete fabrication. And the paradox, the hypocrisy, the contradiction is that many of the people who are attacking me now supported living wills and consultations with doctors about end-of-life care, before they became against it for political reasons." "I worked pretty hard and against the odds to improve end-of-life care. And so to have that record and that work completely perverted—it's pretty shocking."

Rep. Earl Blumenauer, D-Ore., who sponsored the end-of-life provision in H.R. 3200 section 1233, said the measure would block funds for counseling that presents suicide or assisted suicide as an option, and called references to death panels or euthanasia "mind-numbing". Blumenauer said that as recently as April 2008 then-governor Palin supported end-of-life counseling as part of Health Care Decisions Day. Palin's office called this comparison "hysterically funny" and "desperate". Republican Senator Johnny Isakson, who co-sponsored a 2007 end-of-life counseling provision, called the euthanasia claim "nuts". Analysts who examined the end-of-life provision Palin cited agreed that it merely authorized Medicare reimbursement for physicians who provide voluntary counseling for advance health care directives (including living wills).

"Death Panels" 
According to Emanuel, the most important life-saving cancer drugs are rationed not by "death panels" but by The Medicare Prescription Drug, Improvement and Modernization Act of 2003, signed by President George W. Bush. The act limits Medicare payments for generic cancer drugs, which cuts profits from producing them and results in shortages.

Emanuel's previous statements on rationing were about the "allocation of very scarce medical interventions such as organs and vaccines" such as who should get a "liver for transplantation". Ezekiel said that McCaughey's euthanasia claims were a "willful distortion of my record". Jim Rutennberg said that Emanuel's critics oversimplified complex issues, such as who should get a kidney. Such rationing was said to be unavoidable because of scarcity, and because a scarce resource such as a liver is "indivisible". Emanuel said that McCaughey took words out of context, omitting qualifiers such as "Without overstating it (and without fully defending it) ... Clearly, more needs to be done ..." Emanuel once compared the word "rationing" to George Carlin's seven words you can't say on television. In 1994 Emanuel said in testimony before the Senate Finance Committee, "Just because we are spending a lot of money on patients who die does not mean that we can save a lot of money on end of life care."

Emanuel wrote Where Civic Republicanism and Deliberative Democracy Meet (1996) for the Hastings Center Report. In this article Emanuel questioned whether a defect in our medical ethics causes the failure of the US to enact universal health care coverage. The macro level of the issue is the proportion of total gross national product allotted to health care, the micro level is which individual patient will receive specific forms of health care, e.g., "whether Mrs. White should receive this available liver for transplantation." In between are the basic or essential health care services that should be provided to each citizen. The end-stage renal disease program is an example of a service that increases the total cost of health care, and reduces the amount that can be spent on basic or essential health care.

Emanuel distinguished between basic services that should be guaranteed to everybody from discretionary medical services that are not guaranteed. The result would be a two-tiered system, where those with more money could afford more discretionary services. He saw a failure to define basic services as the reason attempts at universal health care coverage have failed. As a result, the belief that universal health care would require unlimited costs makes any attempt at providing universal health care seem likely to end in national bankruptcy. Instead of universal coverage of basic health care, those who are well-insured have coverage for many discretionary forms of health care and no coverage for some basic forms of health care. Emanuel said that while drawing a line separating basic and universal health care from discretionary health care is difficult, the attempt should be made. Emanuel mentioned the philosophies of Amy Gutmann, Norman Daniels and Daniel Callahan when arguing that there is an overlap between liberalism and communitarianism where civic republicanism and deliberative democracy meet. According to The Atlantic, Emanuel is describing the philosophy of John Rawls in arguing that society is choosing one value (equality) over another (a healthy society), and this substitution may be responsible for limited choices in health care. PolitiFact says that Emanuel was describing the fact that doctors often have to make difficult choices, such as who should get a liver transplant. PolitiFact also said, "Academics often write theoretically about ideas that are being kicked around. And they repeat and explore those ideas, without necessarily endorsing them."

When asked if those who are not "participating citizens" should be denied health care, Emanuel said "No" and "The rest of the text around that quote made it made it pretty clear I was trying to analyze it and understand it, not endorse it."

In 2009, Govind Persad, Alan Wertheimer and Ezekiel Emanuel co-wrote another article on a similar topic in the journal The Lancet. Ezekiel was one of three authors who co-wrote Principles for allocation of scarce medical interventions, which examines eight theoretical approaches for dealing with "allocation of very scarce medical interventions such as organs and vaccines." All eight approaches were judged to be less than perfect, and the Complete Lives system combines most of them.

Treating people equally could be accomplished by lottery or first come first served. A lottery system is simple and difficult to corrupt, but blind in that it would treat saving forty years of life the same as saving four months. A first come first served system seems fair at first, but favors the well off, those who are informed, can travel easily and who push to the front of a line.

Favoring the worst off could be accomplished by favoring the sickest first or by favoring the youngest first. Favoring the sickest appeals to the rule of rescue, but organ transplants do not always work well with the sickest patients. Also, a different patient could become equally sick in the future. Favoring the youngest saves the most years of life, but a twenty-year-old has a more developed personality than an infant.

Maximizing total benefits or utilitarianism can be accomplished by saving the most lives or by prognosis (life years). While saving the most lives is best if all else is equal, all else is seldom equal. Going by prognosis alone might unfairly favor improving the health of a person who is healthy to begin with.

Promoting and rewarding social usefulness can be accomplished through instrumental value or by reciprocity. Social usefulness is difficult to define, in that going by conventional values or favoring church goers might be unfair. Instrumental value, such as giving priority to workers producing a vaccine,
cannot be separated from other values, like saving the most lives. Reciprocity (favoring previous organ donors or veterans) might seem like justice, but is backward looking and could lead to demeaning and intrusive inquiries into lifestyle.

When resources (organs, vaccines and so forth) are scarce, the Complete Lives systems blends five different approaches (excluding first come first served, sickest first and reciprocity) but is weighted in favor of saving the most years of life. However, it also emphasizes the importance of saving the large investment of nurture and education spent on an adolescent. It would not favor the young when the prognosis is poor and the number of years of life saved would not be great, when dealing with scarcity.

Emanuel said the Complete Lives system was not meant to apply to health care in general, but only to a situation where "we don't have enough organs for everybody who needs a transplant. You have one liver, you have three people who need the liver - who gets it? The solution isn't 'We get more livers.' You can't. It's a tragic choice."

Of the 1996 Hastings Center Report, Emanuel said, "I was examining two different, abstract philosophical positions to see what they might offer in the context of redoing the health-care system and trying to reduce resource consumption in health care. It's as abstractly philosophical as you can get on a practical question. I qualified it in 27 different ways, saying it wasn't my view." He also said, "As far as rationing goes, it's nothing I've ever advocated for the health system as a whole, and I've talked about rationing only in the context of situations where you have limited items, like limited livers or limited vaccine, and not for overall health care."

Emanuel said that his words were selectively quoted, and misrepresent his views. He said, "I find it a little dispiriting, after a whole career's worth of work dedicated to improving care for people at the end of life, that now I'm 'advocating euthanasia panels.'" Emanuel spent his career opposing euthanasia and received multiple awards for his efforts to improve end of life care. Emanuel said, "It is incredible how much one's reputation can be besmirched and taken out of context" and "No one who has read what I have done for 25 years would come to the conclusions that have been put out there."

Although Emanuel opposes legalized euthanasia, he believes that after age 75 life is not worth living, and the pursuit of longevity, not a worthwhile goal for U.S. health care policy. This is refuted by neurosurgeon and medical ethicist Miguel Faria, who in two articles in Surgical Neurology International claims that healthy lifestyles and brain plasticity can lead to the postponement of senescence and lead to happiness even as we age.

"The Perfect Storm of Overutilization" (2008) 
In the 2008 Journal of the American Medical Association article "The Perfect Storm of Overutilization" Emanuel said, "Overall, US health care expenditures are 2.4 times the average of those of all developed countries ($2759 per person), yet health outcomes for US patients, whether measured by life expectancy, disease-specific mortality rates, or other variables, are unimpressive." He said that expensive drugs and treatments that provide only marginal benefits are the largest problems. Fee-for-service payments, physician directed pharmaceutical marketing, and medical malpractice laws and the resultant defensive medicine encourage overutilization. Direct-to-consumer marketing by pharmaceutical companies also drives up costs.

According to Time, Betsy McCaughey said that Emanuel "has criticized medical culture for trying to do everything for a patient, 'regardless of the cost or effects on others,' without making clear that he was not speaking of lifesaving care but of treatments with little demonstrated value."
Emanuel made a related comment during an interview for The Washington Post, when he said that improving the quality and efficiency of healthcare to avoid unnecessary and even harmful care would be a way to avoid the need for rationing.

One reason the high cost of health care yields disappointing results is because only 0.05 percent of health care dollars are spent on assessing how well new health care technology works. This is largely because health care lobbyists oppose such research. For example, when the Agency for Health Care Policy and Research found that there was little evidence to support common back operations, orthopedic and neurosurgeons lobbied to cut funding for such research.

Emanuel said that fee-for-service reimbursements encourage spending on ineffective health care. However, more should be spent on fraud detection, coordinating health services for patients with multiple doctors, and evaluating the effectiveness of new medical technologies such as genetic fingerprints for cancer and better ways of managing intravenous lines.

In an article in The Washington Post that Emanuel co-wrote with Shannon Brownlee, they described the health care system as "truly dysfunctional, often chaotic", "spectacularly wasteful" and "expensive".

Conflicts of interest 
In a 2007 slideshow Conflicts of Interest, Emanuel said that there were conflicts of interest between a physician's primary responsibilities (providing optimal care for patients, promoting patient safety and public health) and a physician's secondary interests (publishing, educating, obtaining research funding, obtaining a good income and political activism). Emanuel said that while it is difficult to know when conflicts of interest exist, the fact that they do is "the truth". When there is no doubt of a conflict, the issue is not a mere conflict of interest, but fraud.

In a 2007 article Conflict of Interest in Industry-sponsored Drug Development Emanuel said that there is a conflict between the primary interests of drug researchers (conducting and publishing good test results and protecting the patient) and secondary concerns (obligations to family and medical societies and money from industries). However, industry sponsored tests are more likely to use double-blind protocols and randomization, and more likely to preset study endpoints and mention adverse effects. Also, there is no evidence that patients are harmed by such studies. However, there is evidence that money influences how test results are interpreted. Emanuel mentioned the Selfox study on the use of calcium channel blockers in treating hypertension, in which authors with a financial interest in the results reported much better results than the rest. Worse yet, test results sponsored by industry are likely to be widely published only if the results are positive. For example, in a Whittington study for data on selective serotonin reuptake inhibitors, negative results were much less likely to be published than positive results. However, in The Obligation to Participate in Biomedical Research the authors Schaefer, Emanuel and Wertheimer said that people should be encouraged to view participation in biomedical research as a civic obligation, because of the public good that could result.

In a 2017 article Conflict of Interest for Patient-Advocacy Organizations Emanuel found that financial support of patient-advocacy organizations from drug, device, and biotechnology organizations was widespread (83% of reviewed organizations). Later that year, he argued in another article Why There are No "Potential" Conflicts of Interest that conflicts of interest exist whether or not bias or harm has actually occurred.

Recognition
Emanuel has received multiple honors and awards, including the Toppan Dissertation Prize, the Harvard award for best political science dissertation of 1988 and the Dan David Prize for his contribution to the field of bioethics in 2018.

See also
Longevity
List of After Words interviews first aired in 2014
Public image of Sarah Palin
List of members of the National Academy of Medicine
List of people from Wilmette, Illinois
Members of the Council on Foreign Relations

References

Sources

Emanuel, Ezekiel J., Prescription for the Future, 2017. (How to improve the quality of U.S. medical care and how to lower its current exorbitant cost.)

External links

 Author website
 Dr. Ezekiel Emanuel explains why he thinks corporations should support Universal Health Care Vouchers from NOW on PBS
 GHAP At A Glance
 NIH Bio Page
 The Health Reform We Need & Are Not Getting review of Emanuel's Healthcare, Guaranteed: A Simple, Secure Solution for America from The New York Review of Books
 FRESH-Thinking Project Director, FRESH-Thinking Project at Stanford University
 
 Membership at the Council on Foreign Relations

1957 births
American oncologists
American people of Israeli descent
American people of Moldovan-Jewish descent
Amherst College alumni
Center for American Progress people
Bioethicists
Harvard Medical School alumni
Harvard Medical School faculty
Hastings Center Fellows
Living people
National Institutes of Health people
People from Chicago
People from Wilmette, Illinois
University of Pennsylvania faculty
Members of the National Academy of Medicine